Antonella Frontani (Rome, 1 October 1964) is an Italian journalist and writer.

Biography
Antonella Frontani, journalist, writer and TV presenter, lives in Turin. He began his journalistic activity in 2000 with the television network "GRP" as a presenter of the "Salute & Ambiente" program. He organized and conducted the "Focus" program for the production company "RTS", a format designed to represent the main political and cultural events in Piedmont.

Editor-in-chief of the periodical web Ecograffi.

In 2012 he wrote a novel of contemporary fiction published by Seneca editions entitled "Non è stata colpa tua" "It was not your fault".

In 2015 he published for Garzanti books, genre novels and literature, "Tutto l'amore smarrito" "All lost love".

Acknowledgments
 Italian Style http://www.ecograffi.it/2017/04/ad-antonella-frontani-premio-italian-style/
 List of italian journalists' orders. http://www.elencogiornalisti.it/giornalisti/scheda_giornalista/frontani-antonella/59733
   Premio Margutta 2017 La via delle arti

References 

https://www.google.it/search?q=antonella+frontani+libri&ie=UTF-8&oe=UTF-8&hl=it&client=safari#imgrc=20tBm3g5QX2ilM:

https://www.lafeltrinelli.it/libri/antonella-frontani/1346442

http://ricerca.repubblica.it/repubblica/archivio/repubblica/2015/10/01/lamore-smarrito-di-frontani-diventa-un-caso-letterarioTorino14.html

1964 births
Living people
University of Turin alumni
21st-century Italian journalists
20th-century Italian journalists
21st-century Italian novelists